Meike Ziervogel (born 1967, Germany) is a novelist and publisher.

Life

Ziervogel was born in 1967 in Kiel in Germany and grew up in Schleswig-Holstein and Hessen. She came to London in the UK in 1986 to study Arabic language and literature. She received a BA and MA from The School of Oriental and African Studies. She speaks German, English, Arabic and French. Meike is married and has two children, a daughter and a son.

Work
After graduation, Ziervogel worked as a journalist for Reuters in London and Agence France-Presse in Paris. In 2008 she founded Peirene Press, an award-winning independent UK publishing house specialising in contemporary European fiction in English translation. In 2012 Meike was voted as one of Britain's 100 most innovative and influential people in the creative and media industries for the h.Club 100 list devised by Time Out London and the Hospital Club. From 2009 to 2018 she hosted the Peirene literary Salon. 

Ziervogel is the author of five novels. In her work she explores family dynamics, perceptions of reality, and plot lines.  Her debut novel Magda was shortlisted for the Guardian's Not the Booker prize and nominated as a book of the year 2013 by the Irish Times, Observer and Guardian readers. The book was released in Polish translation in January 2015 and reached No6 in the Polish national bestseller list in the same month. Magda has also appeared in German, Catalan and Italian translation. 
Ziervogel's second novel Clara's Daughter was published to critical acclaim in September 2014. Her third novel, Kauthar, was released in August 2015, followed by her fourth novel, The Photographer in 2017 and her fifth love, Flotsam in April 2019.   Meike Ziervogel's books are published in the UK by Salt Publishing and have been translated into German, Italian, Polish and Catalan.

Awards and honours
 Time Out and The Hospital Club h.Club100 list 2012: The 100 most innovative and influential people in the British creative and media industries
 Irish Times Books of the Year, 2013
 Observer Books of the Year, 2013
 Guardian Readers' Books of the Year, 2013
 Guardian's Not the Booker Prize, 2013 (Shortlist)

Selected works

References

External links
Author's website
Peirene Press website

1967 births
Living people
English women novelists
German publishers (people)
Writers from London